IRIS Taregh or Tareq is the first Kilo-class attack submarine of Islamic Republic of Iran Navy, serving in the Southern Fleet. The submarine is part of the 33rd Flotilla, along with two other vessels.

It is the first ever submarine commissioned by any country to serve in the Persian Gulf and the second Iranian-owned submarine after IIS Kousseh (SS 101), which never became operational in the country's fleet.

Construction and commissioning
The contract to build Taregh was signed in 1988. It was reportedly worth $750 million for two submarines, with an option for the third.

Her keel was laid down at Admiralty Shipyard in Saint Petersburg in the same year. She was launched in 1991 and was commissioned on 21 November 1992 at the naval base in Bandar Abbas. Taregh was transferred to Iran via sailing in the Baltic Sea by Russian crew, which began in October 1992. 

It is named after a famous Muslim warrior.

Service history
Shortly after acquisition of Taregh by Iran, American submarine USS Topeka (SSN-754) entered the Persian Gulf in order to monitor Taregh, while its declared mission was "routine maintenance".

According to Jane's, there is no proof that the submarine has ever returned to Russia for a refit. However, following negotiations for an upgrade, a refit began inside Iran in mid 2000s reportedly with the assistance of Rosoboronexport and Sevmash. Ever since, Iran is able to refit Kilo-class submarines on its own. 

Taregh fired electrically propelled torpedoes for the first time in December 2011, during a war-game named Velayat-90.

In May 2012, Iran announced that it had relaunched Taregh after an overhaul in which some 18,000 components, including radar-evading cover, engine parts, propellers and radars were replaced. In the ceremony to rejoin the service, Admiral Habibollah Sayyari said the Russians did not provide Iran with any "instructions on submarine's details and structure", adding that his men had to figure out everything themselves.

In September 2012, it was deployed in the Persian Gulf as a response to the naval drills led by the United States Navy's Fifth Fleet, before being fielded in Velayat-91 exercise for a test of its new armaments. The war-game lasted from December 2012 to January 2013 in the Arabian Sea.

In January 2015, Taregh left home on a mission to provide security for shipping lines sailing from northern parts of the Indian Ocean to the Strait of Malacca and then South China Sea. Almost a year later, the submarine took part in war-game Velayat-94, sailing as far afield as the Sea of Oman and northern Indian Ocean. In November 2016, General Ataollah Salehi declared that Taregh is ready for dispatch as far as the Atlantic Ocean.

Media reports indicate that as of February 2019, Iran has upgraded Taregh to fire submarine-launched cruise missiles.

In popular culture
Taregh fights against American forces in Primary Target, a 2014 thriller war novel by Joe Weber.

See also
 List of current ships of the Islamic Republic of Iran Navy

References

 
 

Submarines of Iran
Attack submarines
Kilo-class submarines
1991 ships
Ships built at Admiralty Shipyard
Submarines of the Islamic Republic of Iran Navy